Daddy Who?... Daddy Cool is the 1971 debut album by Australian rock band Daddy Cool.

Release and promotion 
Released in July, 1971 it was the first on Robie Porter's Sparmac label. It was also the first Australian-recorded album to make No. 1 nationally and it stayed at #1 for seven weeks. Smashing all previous sales records, it achieved gold status within a month, and an unprecedented 60,000 copies sold in its initial release. It went on to become the first Australian LP to sell more than 100,000 copies.

The album was originally issued in a textured cover and featured a cartoon rendering of band members by Melbourne artist Ian McCausland which became the group's logo. While Daddy Cool's guitarist, Ross Hannaford, was responsible for overall album cover design, McCausland created the band's graphics and much of their visual image. The original songs on the album were written by guitarist and vocalist Ross Wilson except "Bom Bom", which was co-written with Hannaford. The rest of the album contained 1950s R&B covers - The Rivals' "Guided Missiles", Etta James' "Good Rockin' Daddy", Marvin & Johnny's "Cherry Pie", The Rays' "Daddy Cool" and Chuck Berry's "School Days".

Daddy Who?... Daddy Cool was also released in the US on the Warner/Reprise label and the band toured in support of its release. Two singles were lifted from the album: "Eagle Rock" No. 1 on the Australian national singles chart and "Come Back Again" which reached No. 3.

The album was re-issued in 1975 (with different sleeve under the title Daddy Who? Daddy Gold!) on Wizard Records (also owned by Porter) and in 1982, with the original artwork but non-gatefold sleeve.

The Australian release on Sparmac Records contains different tracks to the US version on Reprise which was released five months later. The Australian album includes the tracks "Good Rockin' Daddy" and "Cherry Pie" not found on the Reprise edition which features "Flip", "Lollipop" and "Just As Long As We're Together" instead.

Critical reception 

Village Voice critic Robert Christgau reacted negatively to the band's take on 1950s rock and roll, writing in Christgau's Record Guide: Rock Albums of the Seventies (1981) that "imitating it isn't re-creating it—it's killing it."

In October 2010, Daddy Who? Daddy Cool was listed at No. 14 in the book, 100 Best Australian Albums.

Track listing 
All songs written by Ross Wilson unless otherwise indicated.
Australian release
Side one
 "Daddy Cool" (Frank Slay, Bob Crewe) - 2:31
 "School Days" (Chuck Berry) - 3:03
 "Come Back Again" - 4:51
 "At The Rockhouse" - 3:42
 "Guided Missile" (Alfred Gaitwood) - 3:02
 "Good Rockin' Daddy" (Richard Berry, Joseph Bihari as "Joe Josea") - 2:21

Side two
 "Eagle Rock" - 4:07
 "Zoop Bop Gold Cadillac" - 3:56
 "Blind Date" - 4:12
 "Bom Bom" (Ross Wilson, Ross Hannaford) - 2:34
 "Cherry Pie" (Joseph Bihari as "Joe Josea", Marvin Phillips) - 3:40

US release
Side one
 "Daddy Cool" (Frank Slay, Bob Crewe) - 2:31
 "School Days (Ring Goes The Bell)" (Chuck Berry) - 3:03 
 "Come Back Again" - 4:51
 "At The Rockhouse" - 3:42
 "Guided Missile" (Alfred Gaitwood) - 3:02
 "Flip" (Carl Green) - 2:26

Side two
 "Eagle Rock" - 4:07
 "Zoop Bop Gold Cadillac" - 3:55
 "Blind Date" - 4:12
 "Bom Bom" (Ross Wilson/Ross Hannaford) - 2:34
 "Lollipop" (Beverly Ross, Julius Dixon) - 1:36
 "Just As Long As We're Together" - 2:32

Charts

Weekly charts

Year-end charts

Personnel 

Daddy Cool members
 Wayne Duncan - bass guitar, vocals
 Ross Hannaford - guitar, vocals
 Ross Wilson - vocals, guitar, harmonica
 Gary Young- drums, vocals

Additional personnel
 Robie Porter – piano, steel guitar
 Jeremy Noone – saxophone
 Dave Brown – tenor saxophone, flute

Additional credits
 Robie Porter – producer
 Roger Savage – engineer
 Ross Hannaford – cover design
 Ian McCausland – cover graphics

Release history

References 

1971 debut albums
Daddy Cool (band) albums
Warner Records albums
Reprise Records albums
Sparmac albums
Albums produced by Robie Porter